Frank Stubbs was a college football player. He was a prominent quarterback for coach Mike Donahue's Auburn Tigers from 1918 to 1920. Stubbs was the feature of the loss to Georgia in 1920, including a 59-yard punt return with which Auburn failed to score. He once dated Zelda Sayre.

References

American football quarterbacks
Auburn Tigers football players
All-Southern college football players